The Surfer Girl Stakes is a Grade III American Thoroughbred horse race for two-year-old fillies over a distance of one mile on the turf track scheduled annually in October at Santa Anita Park in Arcadia, California. The event currently carries a purse of $200,000.

History

The inaugural running of the event was inaugurated on October 8, 2012, and was won by the Flashy Ways who was trained by Richard Baltas and ridden by the Joseph Talamo by  lengths in a time of 1:34.45. The event was included with a similar event for two-year-old colts and geldings known as the Zuma Beach Stakes which has been run on the same racecard since inception. The name of the event is similar as it refers to sex of the horse with reference to female surfers on the Southern California beaches. Also the name of the event was a 1963 song, Surfer Girl made famous by the Californian based band Beach Boys.

The event is a preparatory race for the Breeders' Cup Juvenile Fillies Turf. Although no horse has won both events, 2017 winner of the Surfer Girl Stakes, French-bred Fatale Bere finished fifth in the Breeders' Cup Juvenile Fillies Turf to Rushing Fall which was held at nearby Del Mar Racetrack. Fatale Bere would go on to win the Grade 1 Del Mar Oaks as a three-year-old in 2018.

In 2022 the event was upgraded by the Thoroughbred Owners and Breeders Association to a Grade III.

Records
Speed record:
1 mile: 1:34.27  – Cairo Memories  (2021) 
 
Margins:
 lengths – Her Emmynency (2014) 

Most wins by an owner:
 No owner has won the event more than once

Most wins by a jockey:
 3 – Kent J. Desormeaux (2016, 2017, 2021)

Most wins by a trainer:
 2 – Doug F. O'Neill (2013, 2018)

Winners

Legend:

See also
List of American and Canadian Graded races

References

2012 establishments in California
Horse races in California
Santa Anita Park
Flat horse races for two-year-old fillies
Turf races in the United States
Graded stakes races in the United States
Recurring sporting events established in 2012
Grade 3 stakes races in the United States